Gunningite is one of the minerals in the Kieserite group, with the chemical formula . Its name honours Henry Cecil Gunning (1901–1991) of the Geological Survey of Canada and a professor at the University of British Columbia.

Occurrence
Gunningite is rare. It is found in dry areas of the oxidized portions of sphalerite-bearing deposits. It has been noted in mines in Canada (Yukon Territory, British Columbia and New Brunswick), the United States (Nevada and Arizona), Switzerland (Valais), Greece, Attica and Germany (Baden-Württemberg).

See also 
List of minerals
List of minerals named after people

References 

Magnesium minerals
Sulfate minerals
Monoclinic minerals
Minerals in space group 15